Christmas Tango (translit. To tango ton Christougennon) is a 2011 Greek drama film directed by Nikos Koutelidakis.

Plot

An unexpected meeting between the sixty-five-year-old Lazaros Lazarou and a young man, on Christmas Day brings back hidden memories from 1970 when a sensual tango at a Christmas celebration at an army camp in Evros was the focus for the intersection of four lives: an introverted soldier; a harsh lieutenant; a strict and very conservative colonel; and Zoi Loggou (Vicky Papadopoulou), the colonel's wife.

Zoi Loggou's life is suffocating until she discovers a secret admirer in the barracks who forces one of his soldiers to teach him how to dance the tango for the Christmas party so that he can get close to Zoi and reveal his love for her.

Coming back to the present and Zoi today is aged about sixty-five and also suffering from Alzheimer's disease.

Cast
 Yannis Bezos as Manolis Loggos
 Antinoos Albanis as Lazaros Lazarou
 Yannis Stankoglou as Stefanos Karamanidis
  as Zoi Loggou
 Eleni Kokkidou as Paraskevi
 Vassilis Risvas as Notis Voskopoulos
 Giannis Papagiannis as Anastasiou
 Foivos Kontogiannis as Balaskas
 Giorgos Papageorgiou as Doctor
 Vangelis Romnios as Bakas
 Thanos Chronis as Kallergis

Accolades

See also
 List of Christmas films

References

External links
 

2011 films
2011 drama films
2010s Christmas drama films
2010s dance films
Films about military personnel
Films based on Greek novels
Films set in 1970
Films set in Greece
Greek drama films
Greek LGBT-related films
2010s Greek-language films